is a Japanese football player. She plays for Mynavi Sendai and Japan national team.

Club career
Kunitake was born in Yamato, Kumamoto on January 10, 1997. After graduating from Musashigaoka College, she joined L.League club Nojima Stella Kanagawa Sagamihara in 2017. She became a regular player as center back and played all 18 matches in first season.

National team career
On July 29, 2018, Kunitake debuted for Japan national team against Brazil. She played 3 games for Japan in 2018.

National team statistics

References

External links
 
 

Japan Football Association
Nojima Stella Kanagawa Sagamihara
MyNavi Sendai Ladies

1997 births
Living people
Association football people from Kumamoto Prefecture
Japanese women's footballers
Japan women's international footballers
Nadeshiko League players
WE League players
Nojima Stella Kanagawa Sagamihara players
Mynavi Vegalta Sendai Ladies players
Women's association football defenders
Footballers at the 2018 Asian Games
Asian Games gold medalists for Japan
Asian Games medalists in football
Medalists at the 2018 Asian Games